Glebelands is Site of Borough Importance for Nature Conservation, Grade I, in Colney Hatch in the London Borough of Barnet. It is also part of the Coppett's Wood and Glebelands Local Nature Reserve.

It is the largest surviving fragment of the habitat of the old Finchley Common. The site is mostly wooded with areas of tall scrub and grassland, and there are numerous streams and seasonal small ponds. The main trees are hawthorn, oak, ash and silver birch. The wetlands have a number of vary rare flora, and it is the only known London site for lesser water plantain. There is a good diversity of breeding birds.

Glebelands is located at the corner of the North Circular Road and High Road, with access from a path between the High Road and Legion Way, off Summers Lane.

See also

Nature reserves in Barnet

External links

References

Nature reserves in the London Borough of Barnet
Parks and open spaces in the London Borough of Barnet
Local nature reserves in Greater London